Barbara Guarischi (born 2 October 1990) is an Italian racing cyclist, who currently rides for UCI Women's WorldTeam . She competed in the 2013 UCI women's team time trial in Florence. In November 2015 she was announced as part of the  team's inaugural squad for the 2016 season.

Major results

2007
 2nd  Scratch, UEC European Junior Track Championships
2009
 6th GP Liberazione
2010
 8th GP Liberazione
 10th Grand Prix de Dottignies
2011
 10th Liberty Classic
2012
 2nd  Road race, UEC European Under-23 Road Championships
 5th Classica Citta di Padova
 6th GP Liberazione
2013
 5th Classica Citta di Padova
2014
 1st Stage 2 La Route de France
 1st Stage 3 Trophée d'Or Féminin
 4th Overall Energiewacht Tour
 4th Drentse 8 van Dwingeloo
 5th Overall Tour of Chongming Island
2015
 1st  Team time trial, UCI Road World Championships
 1st RideLondon Grand Prix
 1st Sparkassen Giro
 1st Stage 2a (TTT) Energiewacht Tour
 1st Stage 1 Giro d'Italia Femminile
 3rd Ronde van Gelderland
 4th EPZ Omloop van Borsele
 5th Novilon EDR Cup
 10th Ronde van Drenthe World Cup
2016
 1st Omloop van Borsele
 3rd Gran Premio Bruno Beghelli Internazionale Donne Elite
2017
 1st  Sprints classification Healthy Ageing Tour
 2nd Pajot Hills Classic
 7th Drentse Acht van Westerveld
 9th RideLondon Classique
2018
 5th Postnord UCI WWT Vårgårda WestSweden
 9th Gent–Wevelgem
2019
 Thüringen Rundfahrt der Frauen
1st  Sprints classification
1st Stage 1
 5th Le Samyn des Dames
2020
 2nd Vuelta a la Comunitat Valenciana Feminas
2021
 2nd Vuelta a la Comunitat Valenciana Feminas
 3rd Dwars door de Westhoek
2022
 1st  Road race, Mediterranean Games
 5th Scheldeprijs
 6th Nokere Koerse voor Dames

References

External links
 

1990 births
Living people
Italian female cyclists
Cyclists from the Province of Bergamo
20th-century Italian women
21st-century Italian women
Mediterranean Games gold medalists for Italy
Competitors at the 2022 Mediterranean Games

Lesbian sportswomen
21st-century LGBT people
Italian LGBT sportspeople
LGBT cyclists